Ralph Benedict D'Agostino Sr. (born August 16, 1940) is an American biostatistician and professor of Mathematics/Statistics, Biostatistics and Epidemiology at Boston University. He is also the director of the Statistics and Consulting Unit of the Framingham Study and the executive director of the M.A./Ph.D. program in biostatistics at Boston University. He was elected a fellow of the American Statistical Association in 1990 and of the American Heart Association in 1991.

His son, Ralph B. D'Agostino Jr., is also a biostatistician and fellow of the American Statistical Association (elected 2013).

References

External links
Faculty page

Living people
American statisticians
Biostatisticians
Boston University faculty
Boston University alumni
Harvard Graduate School of Arts and Sciences alumni
1940 births
People from Somerville, Massachusetts
Fellows of the American Statistical Association
21st-century American mathematicians
20th-century American mathematicians
American epidemiologists
Mathematicians from Massachusetts